John Bodkin may refer to:

 John Bodkin (Warden of Galway) (died 1710)
 John Bodkin (c. 1720 – 1742), hanged, drawn and quartered for the murder of his brother
 John James Bodkin (1801–1882), Irish Whig politician

See also
 John Bodkin Adams (1899–1983), Irish general practitioner, convicted fraudster and suspected serial killer
 John Bodkin fitz Richard, Mayor of Galway, 1518–19
 John Bodkin fitz Dominick, Mayor of Galway, 1638–40